SV Buchonia Flieden is a German association football club in Flieden, Hesse.

History
The association was created in January 1912 in the hotel "Zum Hasenfuß". From its founding until the end of the 1970s the club played as a lower division side with its first notable success coming in 1978 with the team's promotion to the Landesliga Hessen-Nord (V) and their advance to the final of the Hessenpokal in 1980. Despite a 0–2 loss there to RSV Würges the club was entitled to participation in its first DFB-Pokal tournament. Flieden was knocked out in the opening round by 2. Bundesliga side FC Ingolstadt 04 by a score of 1–4 with a crowd of 2,000.

The capture of a Landesliga title in 1996 led to their first-time ascent to the Oberliga Hessen (IV) where they played a single season. Flieden have established themselves as regulars in Hesse's highest amateur league since their return to the Oberliga in 2001, briefly dropping down to the Verbandsliga in 2009–10 before making an immediate return. Finishing last in the league in 2015–16 Buchonia Flieden was relegated from the Hessenliga once more.

Honours
The club's honours:
 Landesliga Hessen-Nord
 Champions: 1996, 2001
 Hessenpokal
 Runners-up: 1980

Recent managers
Recent managers of the club:

Recent seasons
The recent season-by-season performance of the club:

 With the introduction of the Regionalligas in 1994 and the 3. Liga in 2008 as the new third tier, below the 2. Bundesliga, all leagues below dropped one tier. Also in 2008, a large number of football leagues in Hesse were renamed, with the Oberliga Hessen becoming the Hessenliga, the Landesliga becoming the Verbandsliga, the Bezirksoberliga becoming the Gruppenliga and the Bezirksliga becoming the Kreisoberliga.

References

External links
 Official website 
 SV Buchonia Flieden at Weltfussball.de 
 Das deutsche Fußball-Archiv  historical German domestic league tables

Football clubs in Germany
Football clubs in Hesse
Association football clubs established in 1912
1912 establishments in Germany